The New England Skeptical Society (NESS) is an American organization dedicated to promoting science and reason. It was founded in January 1996 as the Connecticut Skeptical Society, by Steven Novella, Perry DeAngelis and Bob Novella. The group later joined with the Skeptical Inquirers of New England (SINE) and the New Hampshire Skeptical Resource to form the New England Skeptical Society. The society publishes The Skeptics' Guide to the Universe, a science and skepticism podcast.

Origins 

In 1995, Perry DeAngelis and Steven Novella, both readers of Skeptical Inquirer, sought to form a local skeptics group in Connecticut after noticing a lack of listings in that magazine for their area. In 1996, DeAngelis, and brothers Steven Novella and Bob Novella, founded the Connecticut Skeptical Society, a precursor to the New England Skeptical Society. In October 1996, Novella appeared on a Ricki Lake talk show about vampires where one guest claimed to be a psychic vampire that could drain people's minds. From the audience, DeAngelis stood to confront the guest concerned and said "Drain me". In response, the psychic claimed that their ability did not work in public.

The group later joined with the Skeptical Inquirers of New England (SINE) and the New Hampshire Skeptical Resource. In October 1997, the group registered as the New England Skeptical Society INC for tax exempt status.

The New England Skeptical Society (NESS) has hosted local lectures on skeptical topics and  conducted investigations into local paranormal claims such as Satanism, homeopathy, dowsing, cults and UFOs.

Investigations

One of the NESS team's more extensive investigations was of Ed and Lorraine Warren who also live in Connecticut. Novella and DeAngelis asked and were promised that they would be allowed to follow along on one of the Warren's investigations, but were repeatedly turned down with different excuses. NESS believes that the Warren's were more interested in protecting their reputation and not scientific advancement. When confronted about their lack of scientific rigor, Ed Warren stated '“you can’t have scientific evidence for a spiritual phenomenon.”' At the conclusion of the NESS investigation of the Warrens, Steven Novella writes, "What they are really hunting for are anomalies – anything even slightly strange. In the ghost-hunting world, anomaly = ghost. Scientific investigation does not enter into the equation."

One of DeAngelis' and Steven Novella's investigations was used in a newspaper analysis of how much truth lay beneath the events portrayed in the movie The Conjuring: "They (The Warrens) claim to have scientific evidence which does indeed prove the existence of ghosts, which sounds like a testable claim into which we can sink our investigative teeth. What we found was a very nice couple, some genuinely sincere people, but absolutely no compelling evidence...."

One ghost hunting group claimed that during a ghost investigation one of the team vanished. NESS was able to borrow the VHS tape for examination. They gave the tape to a technician, who ran the tape on a special machine that allows viewing beyond what is normally seen on a TV monitor screen and showed that someone had been standing next to the camera when the crew member disappeared. The crew member was interviewed and said he did not disappear. All the evidence shows that the camera was turned on and off and no one disappeared.

NESS is critical of ghost hunting groups that claim to be doing scientific work; Novella has said they should "stop saying [they're] doing science, [and] making a mockery of the scientific method."

The NESS is affiliated with the James Randi Educational Foundation (JREF) and had acted as a tester for the Million Dollar Paranormal Challenge prior to its dissolution in 2015. According to Steven Novella, "paranormal claims... represent an opportunity for the skeptical community to teach the public about the proper methods of science, the pitfalls of illogic and self-deception, and the reality of fraud for self-promotion."

On Halloween 1996, NESS was called in to work with a paranormal team to decide if a home was indeed haunted, NESS member Robert Novella created a team of skeptics to investigate. A local radio station was offering a $5,000 prize for evidence of a genuinely haunted house. The New England Society of Psychical Research (NESPR) a group closely affiliated with the Warrens, were also on hand. The home owner "Mary" claimed to have been visited by various ghosts her whole life. Photographs were taken, which were later revealed to be black photos taken in a dark room.

DeAngelis had been told since he was a boy that Newtown, Connecticut was a hotbed for Satanists. After hearing rumors of fresh cases of Satanism in Newtown, DeAngelis spent several days researching on the Internet, and came up with nothing. He researched online and traveled to Newtown to search through the archives of the town newspaper The Newtown Bee, and found nothing concerning Satanism. DeAngelis interviewed the Police Communications Officer who said that there was to his knowledge no Satanic activity happening in Newtown.

Northeast Conference on Science and Skepticism

According to Steven Novella and Evan Bernstein, the NESS was asked to speak for the New York Skeptics, September 12, 2009. That lecture was a tribute to Perry DeAngelis, and as it was near the anniversary of both his birth and death in August, they continued the tradition of celebrating him at each conference. Even after the Northeast Conference on Science and Skepticism (NECSS) organizers decided to move the conference to April, the SGU continues to celebrate the life of DeAngelis each year during their panel.

The Skeptics' Guide to the Universe

NESS is described as one of the makers of the podcast The Skeptics' Guide to the Universe (SGU), which discusses "myths, conspiracy theories, pseudoscience and the paranormal from a scientific point of view. The show also features discussions of recent scientific developments in laymen's terms, and interviews authors and other prominent skeptics."  On September 20, 2006, James Randi joined the podcast providing a weekly commentary segment. The Skeptics' Guide to the Universe is produced by SGU Productions, LLC.

Jay Novella tells podcaster Christopher Brown about the very beginnings of the SGU, they had a friend that wanted to start a political podcast, "we barely knew what podcasting was... Steve said we should start podcasting and all our projects should shift to the web... we like to come up with new segments each year." The SGU later added guest contributors, described as "rogues" to the podcast.

When asked by Christopher Brown "Seven years ago did you personally have any idea that it would take off like this?" SGU rogue answered, "None whatsoever, we did this because we got tired of being just a local skeptics group and publishing a newsletter, which took a lot of work to do, four times a year for about 400 readers... What if we could reach a thousand people by doing this with audio?".  As of April 2012, the SGU reported 25 million downloads since the first podcast was produced in 2005. Steven Novella stated that SGU was launched before the involvement of iTunes and the group struggled with technical aspects of podcasting before the numbers to start to take off following an interview with James Randi, who promoted it on the JREF website. The show was rebroadcast on XM and other stations. SGU became a weekly podcast a few months after launching.

Evan Bernstein speaking from Dragon Con to Richard Saunders about the importance of outreach. "The more we can expand our skeptical outreach to new audiences the better off the entire movement. Frankly we think people in general are better off if they come to understand what it is to have a skeptical worldview." Places like Dragon*Con might have like-minded attendees, but they might never have heard of our organizations and that there are a lot of people are tirelessly working on this.

Blogs
Novella states that he started Neurologica and Science-Based Medicine blogs just after the Podcast started to take off after the first year. His reasoning was that he really enjoyed podcasting, but "there were certain advantages to the written form." He feels that "both podcasting and blogging are both powerful ways to communicating science and skepticism." Oftentimes he will first write the blog, and then will talk about it on the podcast after getting feedback from the blog readers. Blogging is also a way of "crowd-sourcing" as readers may point him to studies and other articles that he wasn't aware of before.

NeuroLogica Blog "is a daily blog authored by NESS president, Steven Novella, covering science, skepticism, neuroscience, and critical thinking."

NESS owns and operates Science-Based Medicine (SBM), a blog dedicated to issues of medicine and science. SBM features health care experts in a variety of fields. Starting in 2015, SBM became a sponsor of NECSS. Editors have included Steven Novella, David Gorski, Kimball Atwood, Mark Crislip, Harriet Hall and Paul Ingraham.

References

External links

 The NESS' official website

Non-profit organizations based in Connecticut
1996 establishments in the United States
New England Skeptical Society
Prizes for proof of paranormal phenomena